OLD (originally an acronym for Old Lady Drivers) was an American heavy metal band from Bergenfield, New Jersey, formed in 1986 and signed to Earache Records. It featured Alan Dubin on vocals, and James Plotkin on guitars and programming, both of whom would later form the experimental doom metal band Khanate

History
OLD formed from the remains of Plotkin's previous band, the short-lived grindcore act "Regurgitation".  OLD's first album, entitled "Old Lady Drivers", continued in the humorous, parodic style of grindcore which characterized Regurgitation's material.

After releasing a split EP with Assück in 1990, Plotkin recruited former Nirvana guitarist Jason Everman for their second album, Lo Flux Tube (1991).  This album featured more avant-garde and industrial metal influences in addition to their basic tongue-in-cheek grindcore, giving them a sound which was compared by some reviewers to a more uptempo Godflesh.  Lo Flux Tube also featured saxophone work by guest musician John Zorn.

OLD continued their avant-garde direction with their third album, The Musical Dimensions Of Sleastak (1993).  Several tracks from that album, "A Beginning", "Two of Me (Parts One and Two)", "Freak Now", and "Peri Cynthion", appeared in the 1994 film Brainscan.

Also in 1993, the band released Hold On To Your Face, an album of remixes.  At the time, the practice of remixing was virtually unheard of in heavy metal music.  The band's final album, Formula (1995), delved into further experimentation with techno and industrial music.  OLD broke up shortly after releasing this album.  Plotkin went on to pursue a successful career not just as a musician, but also as a record producer and remix artist, working with many notable musicians across a number of different genres, particularly drone, noise, and sludge metal.

Members

At the time of the breakup
James Plotkin (guitars, programming)
Alan Dubin (vocals)

Previous members
Jason Everman (bass)
Ralph Pimentel (drums)
Herschel Gaer (bass)

Discography
All releases were on Earache Records, except where otherwise noted.

Old Lady Drivers (Full-length), 1988
Colostomy Grab-Bag (Single), 1989
Assuck/Old Lady Drivers (Split), 1990 (No System Records)
Demo 1990 (self-produced)
Lo Flux Tube (Full-length), 1991
Hold On To Your Face (remixes) (Full-length), 1993
The Musical Dimensions Of Sleastak (Full-length), 1993
Formula (Full-length), 1995

References

External links
OLD at Earache Records
OLD's Myspace page
Interview with James Plotkin circa 1993
 Bandcamp

Heavy metal musical groups from New Jersey
American grindcore musical groups
Heavy metal duos
American musical trios
American industrial metal musical groups
Earache Records artists